The 2021–22 season will be Macarthur FC's second season since its establishment in 2017. The club will competing in the A-League for the second time and in the FFA Cup for the first time.

Players

Transfers

Transfers in

Transfers out

Contracts extensions

Pre-season and friendlies

Competitions

A-League

League table

Matches

FFA Cup

References

Macarthur FC seasons
2021–22 A-League Men season by team